Frenchtown was a historical Pacific Northwest settlement established by Métis and French Canadian fur traders. It was located in Walla Walla County, Washington, United States. Originally called "le village des Canadiens", it became known as "Frenchtown" by later settlers similarly to other settlements such as Frenchtown, Montana. It has also been referred to as "Walla Walla Frenchtown", This Pacific Northwest historical place has become legally recognized through a registered historical foundation. After most French Canadian and Métis residents were expelled in 1855, the area was largely resettled by Americans and the community closest to it was renamed to Lowden in 1915.

History
Michel Pellissier and Catherine D'Aubuchan  built the first cabin in 1823. Joseph LaRocque and Lizette Walla Walla built the second one in 1824, according to best estimates. 
Retired Canadian métis fur traders continued to settle and marry into the local tribes. Roughly twenty French Canadian métis and twenty Ojibway, Cree and Iroquois formed the core. Fifty métis families lived in the area by 1847, as estimated by counting the number of cabins on Thomas Bergevin’s map.  

Following various Indigenous uprisings throughout the Territory of Washington and escalating pressure from settlers arriving on the Oregon Trail, the US Army declared in October 1855 that the Walla Walla valley was under martial law and that all residents including métis, vacate the valley immediately. The order was challenged and a few Frenchtown métis stayed. Hostilities would soon follow. Without any supervision or permission from the US Army, the Oregon Mounted Volunteers (OMV) engaged in the Battle of Walla Walla that followed. The US Army refused to pay or equip the Willamette Valley Volunteers so they “lived off the land”. Food, horses and supplies needed were stolen. The "Battle of Frenchtown" (December 7–10, 1855) ended up being the longest Indigenous battle in the history of Washington Territory. The Frenchtown métis community was shattered. Some families scattered around the Pacific Northwest and some  returned to Canada. Americans filed claims on the land that had been vacated. However, many former Frenchtowners remained in the area, and their descendants maintained a small French-speaking Catholic community until the 1880s.

The original Saint Rose Cemetery was established in 1853 at the site of the Saint Rose of the Cayouse Mission on Yellow Hawk Creek. The 1853 Mission house was burned during the war of 1855. A log chapel was subsequently built on the McBean land claim in 1863. After a few years the St. Rose Mission and cemetery were moved to a site on the Walla Walla River now owned by the Allen family. In 1876 the river burials were moved to a hill at the Frenchtown site and the Saint Rose of Lima Mission Church was erected on the lower portion of the site, which served the French-Canadian community in the area until about 1900. Nearby the city of Walla Walla was established in 1859 and incorporated in 1862. For a while, Walla Walla was the largest community in the territory of Washington. In 1915, Frenchtown name was overtaken to Lowden.

The Frenchtown Historic Foundation was first organized in 1992 to rehabilitate the historical site. It acquired the land for the present-day historic site, including the cemetery, in 2005. A formal opening of the site and rededication of the St. Rose of Lima cemetery occurred in 2010. Relocation and restoration of the "Prince’s cabin" was completed in 2016. Originally located near the Whitman mission, the cabin is believed to be the oldest standing cabin in the state of Washington. It was built for a Cayuse Indian the Hudson’s Bay Company called “The Prince” circa 1837. The Frenchtown Historic Site is currently maintained by the Frenchtown Historical Foundation.

References

French-Canadian American history
Métis in the United States
Walla Walla County, Washington
Eastern Washington